Regis Pierre McGuire (born August 8, 1961) is an American-Canadian ice hockey executive who currently works for Sportsnet and last served as senior vice-president of player development for the Ottawa Senators of the National Hockey League (NHL). He previously worked as a television analyst for NHL on NBC broadcasts in the United States and on The Sports Network (TSN) in Canada. McGuire has also been a player, coach and scout.

Early life
McGuire was born in Englewood Hospital and Medical Center in Englewood, New Jersey, the son of Rex, an Irish-American and Sally, a French-Canadian. He grew up in the Montreal area, (Mount Royal, Westmount and Sainte-Adèle) and attended Lower Canada College.

In 1977, his family moved to Cresskill, New Jersey, due to anti-anglophone sentiment in Montreal that made it difficult for McGuire's father Rex to run his car dealership. McGuire attended Bergen Catholic High School where he played football and hockey.

Playing career
McGuire was a standout hockey defenseman at Hobart College from 1979 to 1982. He also pitched for Hobart's baseball team and played quarterback on the football team for two years. He was graduated from Hobart with an English degree. After college, McGuire played one season of hockey in the Netherlands. In 1984, he attended the New Jersey Devils' training camp, but did not make the team.

Coaching and scouting career

Early career and Pittsburgh Penguins
McGuire began his coaching career at his alma mater, Hobart College, in 1984. He was paid $500 a season and made ends meet by working as a substitute English, math and physical education teacher in the Geneva, New York, school district. In 1985, he was named assistant hockey and lacrosse coach at Babson College. At Babson, he coached hockey under future New York Islanders head coach Steve Stirling. After three seasons at Babson, he moved to St. Lawrence University, where he was an assistant hockey coach from 1988 to 1990. While at St. Lawrence, McGuire met Scotty Bowman, who frequently came to the school to visit his daughter. When Bowman became director of player development and recruitment for the Pittsburgh Penguins on June 12, 1990, he offered McGuire a job as a special assignment scout. When Bowman became interim head coach in 1991, McGuire was named an assistant coach.

Hartford Whalers
McGuire joined the Hartford Whalers on August 28, 1992, as an assistant coach and on September 8, 1993, became the team's assistant general manager. On November 16, 1993, McGuire was named head coach of the Whalers, replacing Paul Holmgren, who had stepped aside due to frustration with a lack of effort from his players and a desire to focus on his role as the team's general manager. At age 32, McGuire was the youngest head coach in the NHL. Prior to becoming coach of the Whalers, McGuire had never been a head coach at any level. During his six months as Whalers head coach, McGuire coached the team to a 23–37–7 record. McGuire was fired as head coach on May 19, 1994. After the termination, captain Pat Verbeek called it the best thing that could have happened to the Whalers. He said his teammates had no respect for McGuire and that McGuire was mocked by other teams. In 1995, NHL commissioner Gary Bettman ruled that McGuire would forfeit half of the remaining salary owed to him by the Whalers for providing confidential coaching evaluations to the Edmonton Oilers. These evaluations had been prepared while he was employed by Hartford.

Later career
Following his departure from the Whalers, McGuire became a scout with the Ottawa Senators. On November 22, 1995, he was elevated to the position of assistant coach. On January 23, 1996, McGuire was fired, along with head coach Dave Allison and goaltending coach Chico Resch.

On August 27, 1996, McGuire was named the inaugural head coach of the ECHL's Baton Rouge Kingfish. He was given a three-year contract. McGuire led the team to a 31–33–6 record and a seventh-place finish in the South Division. On July 12, 1997, McGuire exercised an escape clause in his contract to become the radio analyst for CJAD's broadcasts of Montreal Canadiens games.

Broadcasting career
From  until , McGuire served as color commentator for the Montreal Canadiens' English-language radio broadcasts on CJAD 800 with Dino Sisto. He also worked on some of the team's regional television broadcasts on The Sports Network (TSN) when primary color analyst Gary Green was unavailable and was a contributor to TSN's That's Hockey.

When TSN re-acquired the Canadian national cable rights to NHL hockey in 2002, McGuire was hired as its lead hockey analyst. With TSN, McGuire called the games along with the play-by-play voice of Gord Miller or Chris Cuthbert. He also did special hockey events for TSN, including the NHL Entry Draft and international events like the IIHF World Junior Championships. He also hosted a segment known as "McGuire's Monsters" where he covered a player with a significant impact through a combination of skills.

McGuire joined NBC Sports after they acquired the rights to NHL games in 2006. He usually worked as an "Inside the Glass" reporter with the lead broadcast team of Mike Emrick and Eddie Olczyk.

After the 2011 NHL Entry Draft, McGuire left TSN to work full time for NBC Sports and NBC Sports Network. He continues to appear on TSN Radio.

McGuire also writes for Sports Illustrated and provides frequent commentary on New York's WFAN, Toronto's Sportsnet 590, Ottawa radio station, the Team 1200, the Ottawa Senators' fan podcast SensUnderground, and Montreal's TSN 690 where he can be heard on the Mitch Melnick show, the TEAM 1040 in Vancouver heard on the Canucks Lunch with Rick Ball,  as well as Wednesday mornings on Calgary's Fan 960.

Beyond hockey, McGuire served as a reporter for water polo at the 2012 and 2016 Summer Olympics for NBC, working with his NHL colleague Mike Emrick at the London Games in 2012.

Management career
On July 12, 2021, the Ottawa Senators hired McGuire as the team's senior vice-president of player development. The 59-year-old McGuire had gone nearly three full decades without a managerial job in the NHL. On May 9, 2022, it was announced that McGuire had been let go from this position.

Stances on issues in hockey
McGuire has been outspoken as an advocate of removing the red line and allowing skilled players to play a skilled game without clutching and grabbing impeding them. His views of hockey have him campaigning for all players to wear partial visors. McGuire's outspoken nature provided one of the more interesting stories during the 2004–05 NHL lockout. After McGuire claimed that, if asked to vote privately, more than 70% of NHL players would accept an owner-imposed salary cap; NHL player Tie Domi countered that McGuire was completely off-base. McGuire later retracted part of his claim by saying he never should have given a percentage but that he still believed strongly that assertion was true. In the end, the players accepted a salary cap arrangement in the NHL Collective Bargaining Agreement ratified in 2005.

Personal life
McGuire is a dual citizen of the United States and Canada. He has previously resided in Mount Royal, Quebec; Westmount, Quebec; Sainte-Adèle, Quebec; Cresskill, New Jersey; Alpine, New Jersey; Fort Lee, New Jersey; Hingham, Massachusetts; and Montreal. He currently lives in New Canaan, Connecticut. He has been married twice and has two children, both by his second wife.

Coaching record

References

External links
 TSN profile
 

1961 births
Living people
American television sports announcers
American ice hockey coaches
Anglophone Quebec people
Bergen Catholic High School alumni
Canadian ice hockey coaches
Canadian television sportscasters
ECHL coaches
Hartford Whalers coaches
Hartford Whalers executives
Hobart Statesmen baseball players
Hobart Statesmen football players
Hobart and William Smith Colleges alumni
Internet memes
Montreal Canadiens announcers
National Hockey League broadcasters
Olympic Games broadcasters
Ottawa Senators coaches
Ottawa Senators scouts
People from Alpine, New Jersey
People from Cresskill, New Jersey
People from Fort Lee, New Jersey
People from Hingham, Massachusetts
People from Mount Royal, Quebec
People from New Canaan, Connecticut
People from Westmount, Quebec
Pittsburgh Penguins coaches
Pittsburgh Penguins scouts
St. Lawrence Saints men's ice hockey coaches
Sportspeople from Bergen County, New Jersey
Sportspeople from Fairfield County, Connecticut
Sportspeople from Plymouth County, Massachusetts
Ice hockey people from Montreal
Stanley Cup champions